Jennifer S. Martínez (born November 5, 1971) is an American human rights lawyer and professor of law who serves as the current Dean of Stanford Law School. She is a leading expert on international courts and tribunals, international human rights, and the laws of war.

Education and legal career

Martínez graduated cum laude with distinction from Yale University and magna cum laude from Harvard Law School. During her first year in law school, she was awarded the Sears Prize, which goes to the two students with the highest first year grades.  She served as managing editor of the Harvard Law Review and was twice published in the Law Review. After law school, she clerked for Justice Stephen Breyer, Patricia Wald of the United Nations International Criminal Tribunal for the former Yugoslavia, and Judge Guido Calabresi of the U.S. Court of Appeals for the Second Circuit.

She joined Stanford Law School's faculty in 2003, after working as an attorney at the law firm Jenner & Block in Washington, D.C., and as a senior research fellow and visiting lecturer at Yale University. She has twice been named one of the "100 Most Influential Hispanics" and an "Elite Woman" by Hispanic Business magazine." She also was named to the National Law Journal's list of "Top 40 Lawyers Under 40" and the American Lawyer's "Young Litigators Fab Fifty."  She also has received the Civil Rights Advocacy Award from the La Raza Lawyers of San Francisco and the Ray of Hope Award from Hispanas Organized for Political Equality (HOPE). When asked to cite the best U.S. Supreme Court decision since 1960 by Time, she cited New York Times Co. v. U.S. (1971). She has pointed to the Japanese internment case, Korematsu v. U.S. (1944), as among the worst opinions. Martínez represented José Padilla in the Supreme Court in Rumsfeld v. Padilla.

She is a member of the American Law Institute and the American Academy of Arts and Sciences.

Personal life

In 2004, Martínez married David Silliman Graham. She has four daughters.

See also 
 List of law clerks of the Supreme Court of the United States (Seat 2)

References

External links
Stanford Law School Faculty -- Jenny S. Martinez
Video discussion about International Law with Jennifer Martinez and Henry Farrell on Bloggingheads.tv
 WJP Rule of Law Index (1:31 min), Jenny S. Martinez. YouTube, February 27, 2014.

1971 births
Living people
American legal scholars
Deans of Stanford Law School
Harvard Law School alumni
Law clerks of the Supreme Court of the United States
Lawyers from San Francisco
People associated with Jenner & Block
Stanford Law School faculty
Women deans (academic)
Yale University alumni